Old Strother Place, also known as Fruit Hill, is a historic plantation home and national historic district located near Saluda, Saluda County, South Carolina.  It was built about 1856, and is a two-story, frame vernacular Greek Revival style farmhouse. Also on the property are a contributing barn and kitchen building (c. 1856), garage (c. 1930), and water tower (c. 1936).

It was added to the National Register of Historic Places in 1994.

References

Houses on the National Register of Historic Places in South Carolina
Historic districts on the National Register of Historic Places in South Carolina
Greek Revival houses in South Carolina
Houses completed in 1856
Houses in Saluda County, South Carolina
National Register of Historic Places in Saluda County, South Carolina